, Plants of the World Online listed 1,688 accepted genera in the family Asteraceae. Those genera are listed with their author citations. Taxonomic synonyms are not included.

A 

List of genera is from Plants of the World Online  unless otherwise cited.

Aaronsohnia Warb. & Eig
Abrotanella Cass.
Acamptopappus A.Gray – goldenhead
Acanthocephalus Kar. & Kir.
Acanthocladium F.Muell.
Acanthodesmos C.D.Adams & duQuesnay
Acanthospermum Schrank – starburr
Acanthostyles R.M.King & H.Rob.
Achillea L. – yarrow
Achnophora F.Muell.
Achnopogon Maguire, Steyerm. & Wurdack
Achyrachaena Schauer – blow wives
Achyranthemum N.G.Bergh
Achyrocline (Less.) DC.
Achyropappus Kunth
Acilepidopsis H.Rob.
Acilepis D.Don
Acmella Rich. ex Pers.
Acomis F.Muell.
Acourtia D.Don – desert peony
Acrisione B.Nord.
Acritopappus R.M.King & H.Rob.
Actinobole Endl.
Acunniana Orchard
Adelostigma Steetz
Adenanthellum B.Nord.
Adenocaulon Hook. – trailplant
Adenocritonia R.M.King & H.Rob.
Adenoglossa B.Nord.
Adenoon Dalzell
Adenophyllum Pers. – dogweed
Adenostemma J.R.Forst. & G.Forst. – medicineplant
Adenostyles Cass.
Adenothamnus D.D.Keck
Aedesia O.Hoffm.
Aequatorium B.Nord
Aetheolaena Cass.
Aetheorhiza Cass.
Afroaster J.C.Manning & Goldblatt
Ageratella A.Gray ex S.Watson
Ageratina Spach – snakeroot
Ageratinastrum Mattf.
Ageratum L. – whiteweed
Agnorhiza (Jeps.) W.A.Weber
Agoseris Raf. – mountain dandelion
Agrianthus Mart. ex DC.
Ainsliaea DC.
Ajania Poljakov
Ajaniopsis C.Shih
Alatoseta Compton
Albertinia Spreng.
Aldama La Llave
Alepidocline S.F.Blake
Alfredia Cass.
Aliella Qaiser & Lack
Allagopappus Cass.
Allardia Decne.
Allittia P.S.Short
Allocephalus Bringel, J.N.Nakaj. & H.Rob.
Alloispermum Willd.
Allopterigeron Dunlop
Almutaster Á.Löve & D.Löve – alkali marsh aster 
Alomia Kunth
Alomiella R.M.King & H.Rob.
Amauria Benth.
Ambassa Steetz
Amberboa (Pers.) Less.
Amblyolepis DC.
Amblyopappus Hook. & Arn.
Amblysperma Benth.
Amboroa Cabrera
Ambrosia L. – bursage, ragweed
Ameghinoa Speg.
Amellus L.
Ammobium R.Br.
Amolinia R.M.King & H.Rob.
Ampelaster G.L.Nesom – climbing aster
Amphiachyris (DC.) Nutt. – broomweed
Amphiglossa DC.
Amphipappus Torr. & A.Gray – chaffbush
Amphoricarpos Vis.
Anacantha (Iljin) Soják
Anacyclus L.
Ananthura H.Rob. & Skvarla
Anaphalioides (Benth. & Hook.f.) Kirp.
Anaphalis DC. – pearly everlasting
Anastraphia D.Don
Anaxeton Gaertn.
Ancathia DC.
Ancistrocarphus A.Gray
Anderbergia B.Nord.
Andicolea Mayta & Molinari
Andryala L.
Anemocarpa Paul G.Wilson
Angeldiazia M.O.Dillon & Zapata
Angianthus J.C.Wendl.
Anisocarpus Nutt.
Anisochaeta DC.
Anisocoma Torr. & A.Gray
Anisopappus Hook. & Arn.
Antennaria Gaertn. – pussytoes
Anteremanthus H.Rob.
Anthemis L. – Roman chamomile
Anticona E.Linares, J.Campos & A.Galán
Antillanthus B.Nord.
Antillia R.M.King & H.Rob.
Antiphiona Merxm.
Anvillea DC.
Apalochlamys Cass.
Aphanactis Wedd.
Aphanostephus DC. – doze daisy
Aphelexis D.Don
Aphyllocladus Wedd.
Apodocephala Baker
Apopyros G.L.Nesom
Aposeris Neck.
Apostates Lander
Apowollastonia Orchard
Aquilula G.L.Nesom
Arbelaezaster Cuatrec.
Archanthemis Lo Presti & Oberpr.
Archibaccharis Heering
Archidasyphyllum (Cabrera) P.L.Ferreira, Saavedra & Groppo
Archiserratula L.Martins
Arctium L. – burdock
Arctogeron DC.
Arctotheca J.C.Wendl. – capeweed
Arctotis L.
Argentipallium Paul G.Wilson
Argyranthemum Webb – dill daisy
× Argyrautia Sherff
Argyroglottis Turcz.
Argyrotegium J.M.Ward & Breitw.
Argyroxiphium DC. – silversword
Aristeguietia R.M.King & H.Rob.
Arnaldoa Cabrera
Arnica L. – arnica
Arnicastrum Greenm.
Arnoglossum Raf. – Indian plantain
Arnoseris Gaertn.
Arrhenechthites Mattf.
Arrojadocharis Mattf.
Arrowsmithia DC.
Artemisia L. – tarragon, sagebrush, sagewort, wormwood, mugwort
Artemisiopsis S.Moore
Asanthus R.M.King & H.Rob. – brickellbush
Ascidiogyne Cuatrec.
Askellia W.A.Weber
Aspilia Thouars
Asplundianthus R.M.King & H.Rob.
Astartoseris N.Kilian, Hand, Hadjik., Christodoulou & Bou Dagh.
Aster L. – aster
Asteridea Lindl.
Asteriscus Mill.
Asterothamnus Novopokr.
Astranthium Nutt. – western daisy
Athanasia L.
Athrixia Ker Gawl.
Athroisma DC.
Atractylis L.
Atractylodes DC.
Atrichantha Hilliard & B.L.Burtt
Atrichoseris A.Gray
Austrobrickellia R.M.King & H.Rob.
Austrocritonia R.M.King & H.Rob.
Austroeupatorium R.M.King & H.Rob.
Austroliabum H.Rob. & Brettell 
Austrosynotis C.Jeffrey
Axiniphyllum Benth.
Ayapana Spach
Ayapanopsis R.M.King & H.Rob.
Aynia H.Rob.
Aztecaster G.L.Nesom

B

List of genera is from Plants of the World Online  unless otherwise cited.

Baccharis L. – baccharis
Baccharoides Moench
Baculellum L.V.Ozerova & A.C.Timonin
× Bacurio Gideon F.Sm. & Figueiredo
Badilloa R.M.King & H.Rob.
Baeriopsis J.T.Howell
Bahianthus R.M.King & H.Rob.
Bahiopsis Kellogg
Baileya Harv. & A.Gray – desert marigold
Bajacalia Loockerman, B.L.Turner & R.K.Jansen
Balduina Nutt. – honeycombhead
Balladonia P.S.Short
Balsamorhiza Hook. – balsamroot
Baltimora L. – baltimora
Barkleyanthus H.Rob. & Brettell – willow ragwort
Barnadesia Mutis ex L.f.
Barrosoa R.M.King & H.Rob.
Bartlettia A.Gray
Bartlettina R.M.King & H.Rob.
Basedowia E.Pritz.
Bathysanthus G.L.Nesom
Batopilasia G.L.Nesom & R.D.Noyes
Bebbia Greene – sweetbush
Bechium DC.
Bedfordia DC.
Bejaranoa R.M.King & H.Rob.
Bellida Ewart
Bellis L. – daisy
Bellium L.
Belloa J.Rémy
Benitoa D.D.Keck
Berardia Vill.
Berkheya Ehrh.
Berlandiera DC. – greeneyes
Berroa Beauverd
Bertilia Cron
Berylsimpsonia B.L.Turner
Bethencourtia Choisy
Bidens L. – beggartick, sticktight, Spanish needles
Bigelowia DC. – rayless goldenrod
Bishopanthus H.Rob.
Bishopiella R.M.King & H.Rob.
Bishovia R.M.King & H.Rob.
Blainvillea Cass.
Blakiella Cuatrec.
Blanchetia DC.
Blennosperma Less. – stickyseed
Blennospora A.Gray
Blepharipappus Hook.
Blepharispermum DC.
Blepharizonia (A.Gray) Greene
Blumea DC. – false oxtongue
Boeberastrum Rydb.
Boeberoides (DC.) Strother
Bolandia Cron
Bolanosa A.Gray
Boltonia L'Hér. – doll's daisy
Bombycilaena (DC.) Smoljan.
Borrichia Adans. – seaside tansy
Bothriocline Oliv. ex Benth.
Brachanthemum DC.
Brachionostylum Mattf.
Brachyclados D.Don
Brachyglottis J.R.Forst. & G.Forst.
Brachylaena R.Br.
Brachyscome Cass.
Brachythrix Wild & G.V.Pope
Bradburia Torr. & A.Gray
Brenandendron H.Rob.
Brickellia Elliott – brickellbush
Brickelliastrum R.M.King & H.Rob. – brickellbush
Brintonia Greene – mock goldenrod
Brocchia Vis.
Buphthalmum L.
Burkartia Crisci

C

List of genera is from Plants of the World Online  unless otherwise cited.

Caatinganthus H.Rob.
Cabobanthus H.Rob.
Cabreraea Bonif.
Cabreriella Cuatrec.
Cacaliopsis A.Gray
Cacosmia Kunth
Cadiscus E.Mey. ex DC.
Caesulia Roxb.
Calanticaria (B.L.Rob. & Greenm.) E.E.Schill. & Panero
Calea L.
Calendula L. – marigold
Callicephalus C.A.Mey.
Callilepis DC.
Callistephus Cass.
Calocephalus R.Br.
Calomeria Vent.
Calorezia Panero
Calostephane Benth.
Calotesta P.O.Karis
Calotis R.Br.
Calycadenia DC. – western rosinweed
Calycoseris A.Gray – tackstem
Calyptocarpus Less.
Camchaya Gagnep.
Campovassouria R.M.King & H.Rob.
Camptacra N.T.Burb.
Campuloclinium DC.
Canadanthus G.L.Nesom – mountain aster
Cancrinia Kar. & Kir.
Cancriniella Tzvelev
Capelio B.Nord.
Caputia B.Nord. & Pelser
Cardopatium Juss.
× Carduocirsium Sennen
Carduus L. – plumeless thistle
Carlina L. – carline thistle
Carlquistia B.G.Baldwin
Carminatia Moc. ex DC.
Carpesium L.
Carphephorus Cass. – chaffhead
Carphochaete A.Gray – bristlehead
Carthamus L. – distaff thistle
Cassinia R.Br.
Castanedia R.M.King & H.Rob.
Castrilanthemum Vogt & Oberpr.
Castroviejoa Galbany, L.Sáez & Benedí
Catamixis Thomson
Catananche L.
Catatia Humbert
Catolesia D.J.N.Hind
Caucasalia B.Nord.
Cavalcantia R.M.King & H.Rob.
Cavea W.W.Sm. & J.Small
Caxamarca M.O.Dillon & Sagást.
× Celmearia Heenan
Celmisia Cass.
Centaurea L. – knapweed, cornflower, star thistle
Centaurodendron Johow
Centauropsis Bojer ex DC.
Centaurothamnus Wagenitz & Dittrich
Centenaria P.Gonzáles, A.Cano & H.Rob.
Centipeda Lour.
Centratherum Cass.
Centromadia Greene
Centropappus Hook.f.
Cephalipterum A.Gray
Cephalopappus Nees & Mart.
Cephalosorus A.Gray
Ceratogyne Turcz.
Ceruana Forssk.
Chacoa R.M.King & H.Rob.
Chaenactis DC. – pincushion
Chaetadelpha A.Gray ex S.Watson – skeletonweed
Chaetanthera Ruiz & Pav.
Chaetopappa DC. – least daisy
Chaetymenia Hook. & Arn.
Chamaechaenactis Rydb.
Chamaegeron Schrenk.
Chamaeleon Cass.
Chamaemelum Mill. - dogfennel
Chamaepus Wagenitz
Chaochienchangia G.L.Nesom
Chaptalia Vent. – sunbonnetts
Charadranaetes Janovec & H.Rob.
Chardinia Desf.
Cheirolophus Cass.
Chersodoma Phil.
Chevreulia Cass.
Chiliadenus Cass.
Chiliocephalum Benth.
Chiliophyllum Phil.
Chiliotrichiopsis Cabrera
Chiliotrichum Cass.
Chimantaea Maguire, Steyerm. & Wurdack
Chionolaena DC.
Chionopappus Benth.
Chlamydophora Ehrenb. ex Less.
Chloracantha G.L.Nesom, Y.B.Suh, D.R.Morgan, S.D.Sundb. & B.B.S
Chondrilla L.
Chondropyxis D.A.Cooke
Chresta Vell. ex DC.
Chromolaena DC. - thoroughwort
Chromolepis Benth.
Chronopappus DC.
Chrysactinia A.Gray
Chrysactinium Wedd.
Chrysanthellum Rich.
Chrysanthemum L.
Chrysanthoglossum B.H.Wilcox, K.Bremer & Humphries
Chryselium Urtubey & S.E.Freire
Chrysocephalum Walp.
Chrysocoma L.
Chrysogonum L.
Chrysolaena H.Rob.
Chrysoma Nutt.
Chrysophthalmum Sch.Bip. ex Walp.
Chrysopsis (Nutt.) Elliott – goldenaster
Chrysothamnus Nutt. – rabbitbrush
Chthonocephalus Steetz
Chucoa Cabrera
Chuquiraga Juss.
Cicerbita Wallr.
Ciceronia Urb.
Cichorium L. – chicory
Cineraria L.
Cirsium Mill. – thistle
Cissampelopsis Miq.
Cladanthus Cass.
Cladochaeta DC.
Clappia A.Gray – clapdaisy
Clibadium L.
Cloiselia S.Moore
Cnicothamnus Griseb.
Coleocoma F.Muell.
Coleostephus Cass.
Colobanthera Humbert
Cololobus H.Rob.
Columbiadoria G.L.Nesom 
Comaclinium Scheidw. & Planch.
Commidendrum Burch. ex DC.
Condylidium R.M.King & H.Rob.
Condylopodium R.M.King & H.Rob.
Conocliniopsis R.M.King & H.Rob.
Conoclinium DC.
Constancea B.G.Baldwin
Cordiofontis G.L.Nesom
Coreocarpus Benth.
Coreopsis L. – tickseed
Corethamnium R.M.King & H.Rob.
Corethrogyne DC. – sandaster
Coronidium Paul G.Wilson
Corymbium Gronov.
Cosmos Cav.
Cota J.Gay
Cotula L. – waterbuttons
Coulterella Vasey & Rose
Cousinia Cass.
Cousiniopsis Nevski
Craspedia G.Forst.
Crassocephalum Moench – ragleaf
Crassothonna B.Nord.
Cratystylis S.Moore
Cremanthodium Benth.
Cremnothamnus Puttock
× Crepi-hieracium P.Fourn.
Crepidiastrum Nakai
Crepis L. – hawksbeard
Criscia Katinas
Criscianthus Grossi & J.N.Nakaj.
Critonia P.Browne – thoroughwort
Critoniadelphus R.M.King & H.Rob.
Critoniella R.M.King & H.Rob.
Critoniopsis Sch.Bip.
Crocidium Hook. – spring-gold
Crocodilium Hill
Cronquistianthus R.M.King & H.Rob.
Croptilon Raf. – scratchdaisy
Crossostephium Less.
Crossothamnus R.M.King & H.Rob.
Crupina (Pers.) DC.
Crystallopollen Steetz
Cuatrecasanthus H.Rob.
Cuatrecasasiella H.Rob.
Cuchumatanea Seid. & Beaman
Culcitium Bonpl.
Cullumia R.Br.
Cuniculotinus Urbatsch, R.P.Roberts & Neubig
Curio P.V.Heath
Cuspidia Gaertn.
Cyanthillium Blume
Cyathocline Cass.
Cyathomone S.F.Blake
Cyclachaena Fresen.
Cyclolepis Gillies ex D.Don
Cylindrocline Cass.
Cymbonotus Cass.
Cymbopappus B.Nord.
Cymophora B.L.Rob.
Cynara L. – artichoke
Cyrtocymura H.Rob.

D

List of genera is from Plants of the World Online  unless otherwise cited.

Dacryotrichia Wild
Dahlia Cav.
Damnamenia Given
Damnxanthodium Strother
Dasyandantha H.Rob.
Dasyanthina H.Rob.
Dasycondylus R.M.King & H.Rob.
Dasyphyllum Kunth
Dauresia B.Nord. & Pelser
Daveaua Willk. ex Mariz
Davilanthus E.E.Schill. & Panero
Decachaeta DC.
Decaneuropsis H.Rob. & Skvarla
Decastylocarpus Humbert
Decazesia F.Muell.
Deinandra Greene
Delairea Lem. – capeivy
Delamerea S.Moore
Delilia Spreng.
Delwiensia W.A.Weber & R.C.Wittmann
Dendrocacalia (Nakai) Nakai
Dendrophorbium (Cuatrec.) C.Jeffrey
Dendrosenecio (Hauman ex Humbert) B.Nord.
Dendroviguiera E.E.Schill. & Panero
Denekia Thunb.
Desmanthodium Benth.
Dewildemania O.Hoffm.
Diacranthera R.M.King & H.Rob.
Diaperia Nutt.
Diaphractanthus Humbert
Dicercoclados C.Jeffrey & Y.L.Chen
Dicerothamnus Koek.
Dichaetophora A.Gray
Dichrocephala L'Hér. ex DC.
Dichromochlamys Dunlop
Dicoma Cass.
Dicomopsis S.Ortiz
Dicoria Torr. & A.Gray – twinbugs
Dicranocarpus A.Gray
Didelta L'Hér.
Dielitzia P.S.Short
Dieteria Nutt.
Digitacalia Pippen
Dillandia V.A.Funk & H.Rob.
Dimeresia A.Gray
Dimerostemma Cass.
Dimorphocoma F.Muell. & Tate
Dimorphotheca Moench – cape marigold
Diodontium F.Muell.
Diplostephium Kunth
Dipterocome Fisch. & C.A.Mey.
Dipterocypsela S.F.Blake
Disparago Gaertn.
Dissothrix A.Gray
Distephanus Cass.
Disynaphia DC.
Dithyrostegia A.Gray
Dittrichia Greuter
Doellingeria Nees – whitetop
Dolichlasium Lag.
Dolichoglottis B.Nord.
Dolichorrhiza (Pojark.) Galushko
Dolichothrix Hilliard & B.L.Burtt
Dolomiaea DC.
Doniophyton Wedd.
Dorobaea Cass.
Doronicum L. – false leopardbane
Dresslerothamnus H.Rob.
Dubautia Gaudich.
Dubyaea DC.
Dugesia A.Gray
Duhaldea DC.
Duidaea S.F.Blake
Duseniella K.Schum.
Dymondia Compton
Dysaster H.Rob. & V.A.Funk
Dyscritothamnus B.L.Rob.
Dysodiopsis Rydb. – dogfennel
Dyssodia Cav. – dogweed

E

List of genera is from Plants of the World Online  unless otherwise cited.

Eastwoodia Brandegee
Eatonella A.Gray
Echinacea Moench – coneflower
Echinocoryne H.Rob.
Echinops L. – globethistle
Eclipta L.
Edmondia Cass.
Egletes Cass. – tropic daisy
Eirmocephala H.Rob.
Eitenia R.M.King & H.Rob.
Ekmania Gleason
Ekmaniopappus Borhidi
Elachanthus F.Muell.
Elaphandra Strother
Electranthera Mesfin, D.J.Crawford & Pruski
Elekmania B.Nord.
Elephantopus L. – elephantsfoot
Eleutheranthera Poit.
Ellenbergia Cuatrec.
Elytropappus Cass.
Emilia Cass. – tasselflower
Encelia Adans. – brittlebush
Enceliopsis (A.Gray) A.Nelson – sunray
Endocellion Turcz. ex Herder
Endopappus Sch.Bip.
Engelmannia Torr. & A.Gray – Engelmann's daisy
Engleria O.Hoffm.
Enydra Lour. – swampwort
Epaltes Cass.
Ephedrides G.L.Nesom
Epilasia (Bunge) Benth. & Hook.f.
Epitriche Turcz.
Erato DC.
Erechtites Raf. – burnweed
Eremanthus Less.
Eremosis (DC.) Gleason
Eremothamnus O.Hoffm.
Eriachaenium Sch.Bip.
Ericameria Nutt. – goldenbush, heath goldenrod
Ericentrodea S.F.Blake & Sherff
Erigeron L. – daisy, fleabane
Eriocephalus L.
Eriochlamys Sond. & F.Muell.
Eriophyllum Lag. – woolly sunflower
Eriotrix Cass.
Erlangea Sch.Bip.
Erodiophyllum F.Muell.
Erymophyllum Paul G.Wilson
Erythrocephalum Benth.
Erythroseris N.Kilian & Gemeinholzer
Eschenbachia Moench
Espejoa DC.
Espeletia Bonpl. – frailejón
Ethulia L.f.
Euchiton Cass. – cudweed
Eumorphia DC.
Eupatoriastrum Greenm.
Eupatorina R.M.King & H.Rob.
Eupatoriopsis Hieron.
Eupatorium L. – thoroughwort, snakeweed
Euphrosyne DC.
Eurybia (Cass.) Cass.
Eurydochus Maguire & Wurdack
Euryops (Cass.) Cass.
Eutetras A.Gray
Euthamia (Nutt.) Cass. – goldentop
Eutrochium Raf. – Joe-Pye weed
Ewartia Beauverd
Ewartiothamnus Anderb.
Exomiocarpon Lawalrée
Exostigma G.Sancho

F

List of genera is from Plants of the World Online  unless otherwise cited.

Faberia Hemsl. ex F.B.Forbes & Hemsl.
Facelis Cass. – trampweed
Famatinanthus Ariza & S.E.Freire
Farfugium Lindl.
Faujasia Cass.
Faujasiopsis C.Jeffrey
Faxonia Brandegee
Feddea Urb.
Feldstonia P.S.Short
Felicia Cass.
Fenixia Merr.
Ferreyranthus H.Rob. & Brettell
Ferreyrella S.F.Blake
Filago Loefl. – cottonrose
Filifolium Kitam.
Fitchia Hook.f.
Fitzwillia P.S.Short
Flaveria Juss. – yellowtops
Fleischmannia Sch.Bip. – thoroughwort
Fleischmanniopsis R.M.King & H.Rob.
Florestina Cass.
Floscaldasia Cuatrec.
Flosmutisia Cuatrec.
Flourensia DC. – tarwort
Fluminaria N.G.Bergh
Flyriella R.M.King & H.Rob. – brickellbush
Formania W.W.Sm. & Small
Foveolina Källersjö
Freya V.M.Badillo
Fulcaldea Poir.

G

List of genera is from Plants of the World Online  unless otherwise cited.

Gaillardia Foug. – blanketflower
Galactites Moench
Galatella Cass.
Galeana La Llave
Galeomma Rauschert
Galinsoga Ruiz & Pav. – gallant-soldier
Gamochaeta Wedd. – everlasting
Garberia A.Gray
Garcibarrigoa Cuatrec.
Gardnerina R.M.King & H.Rob.
Garhadiolus Jaub. & Spach
Garuleum Cass.
Gazania Gaertn.
Geigeria Griess.
Geissolepis B.L.Rob.
Gelasia Cass.
Geraea Torr. & A.Gray – desert sunflower
Gerbera L. – Gerbera or Transvaal daisy
Geropogon L.
Gibbaria Cass.
Gilberta Turcz.
Gilruthia Ewart
Gladiopappus Humbert
× Glebianthemum J.M.Watson & A.R.Flores
Glebionis Cass.
Glossarion Maguire & Wurdack
Glossocardia Cass.
Glossopappus Kunze
Glyptopleura D.C.Eaton
Gnaphaliothamnus Kirp.
Gnaphalium L. – cudweed
Gnephosis Cass.
Gnomophalium Greuter
Gochnatia Kunth
Goldmanella Greenm.
Gongrostylus R.M.King & H.Rob.
Gongylolepis Schomb.
Goniocaulon Cass.
Gonospermum Less.
Gonzalezia E.E.Schill. & Panero
Gorceixia Baker
Gorteria L.
Gossweilera S.Moore
Goyazianthus R.M.King & H.Rob.
Grangea Adans.
Grangeopsis Humbert
Graphistylis B.Nord.
Gratwickia F.Muell.
Grauanthus Fayed
Grazielia R.M.King & H.Rob.
Greenmaniella W.M.Sharp
Grindelia Willd. – gumweed
Grisebachianthus R.M.King & H.Rob.
Grosvenoria R.M.King & H.Rob.
Guardiola Cerv. ex Bonpl.
Guayania R.M.King & H.Rob.
Guevaria R.M.King & H.Rob.
Guizotia Cass.
Gundelia L.
Gundlachia A.Gray
Gutenbergia Sch.Bip.
Gutierrezia Lag. – snakeweed
Guynesomia Bonif. & G.Sancho
Gymnanthemum Cass.
Gymnarrhena Desf.
Gymnocondylus R.M.King & H.Rob.
Gymnocoronis DC.
Gymnodiscus Less.
Gymnolaena Rydb.
Gymnopentzia Benth.
Gymnosperma Less.
Gynoxys Cass.
Gynura Cass.
Gypothamnium Phil.
Gyptidium R.M.King & H.Rob.
Gyptis Cass.
Gyrodoma Wild

H

List of genera is from Plants of the World Online  unless otherwise cited.

Haastia Hook.f.
Haeckeria F.Muell.
Haegiela P.S.Short & Paul G.Wilson
Hainanecio Ying Liu & Q.E.Yang
Handelia Heimerl
Haplocarpha Less. – onefruit
Haploesthes A.Gray – false broomweed
Haplopappus Cass.
Haptotrichion Paul G.Wilson
Harleya S.F.Blake
Harmonia B.G.Baldwin
Harnackia Urb.
Haroldia Bonif.
Hartwrightia A.Gray
Hasteola Raf. – false Indian plantain
Hatschbachiella R.M.King & H.Rob.
Hazardia Greene – bristleweed
Hebeclinium DC. – thoroughwort
Hecastocleis A.Gray
Hedosyne Strother
Hedypnois Mill.
Heiseria E.E.Schill. & Panero
Helenium L. – sneezeweed
Helianthella Torr. & A.Gray
Helianthus L. – sunflowers
Helichrysopsis Kirp.
Helichrysum Mill. – strawflower, everlasting
Heliocauta Humphries
Heliomeris Nutt. – false goldeneye
Heliopsis Pers.
Helminthotheca Zinn
Helodeaster G.L.Nesom
Helogyne Nutt.
Hemizonella A.Gray
Hemizonia DC. – tarweed
Henricksonia B.L.Turner
Heptanthus Griseb.
Herderia Cass.
Herodotia Urb. & Ekman
Herreranthus B.Nord.
Hertia Less.
Hesperevax A.Gray – dwarf-cudweed
Hesperomannia A.Gray – island-aster
Heteracia Fisch. & C.A.Mey.
Heteranthemis Schott – oxeye
Heterocoma DC.
Heterocondylus R.M.King & H.Rob.
Heterocypsela H.Rob.
Heteroderis Boiss.
Heterolepis Cass.
Heteromera Pomel
Heteromma Benth.
Heteroplexis C.C.Chang
Heterorhachis Sch.Bip. ex Walp.
Heterosperma Cav.
Heterotheca Cass. – goldenasters, camphorweed, telegraph weed
Hidalgoa La Llave
Hieracium L. – hawkweed
Hilliardia B.Nord.
Hilliardiella H.Rob.
Hinterhubera Sch.Bip. ex Wedd.
Hippia L. 
Hippolytia Poljakov
Hirpicium Cass.
Hirtellina Cass.
Hispidella Barnadez ex Lam.
Hoehnephytum Cabrera
Hoffmannanthus H.Rob., S.C.Keeley & Skvarla
Hoffmanniella Schltr. ex Lawalrée
Hofmeisteria Walp.
Holocarpha Greene – tarweed
Holocheilus Cass.
Hololeion Kitam.
Hololepis DC.
Holoschkuhria H.Rob.
Holozonia Greene
Homogyne Cass.
Hoplophyllum DC.
Huarpea Cabrera
Huberopappus Pruski
Hubertia Bory
Hughesia R.M.King & H.Rob.
Hullsia P.S.Short
Hulsea Torr. & A.Gray – alpinegold
Humbertacalia C.Jeffrey
Humeocline Anderb.
Hyalis D.Don ex Hook. & Arn.
Hyalochlamys A.Gray
Hyaloseris Griseb.
Hyalosperma Steetz
Hybridella Cass.
Hydroidea P.O.Karis
Hydropectis Rydb.
Hymenocephalus Jaub. & Spach
Hymenolepis Cass.
Hymenonema Cass.
Hymenopappus L'Her.
Hymenostemma Kunze ex Willk.
Hymenostephium Benth.
Hymenothrix A.Gray – thimblehead
Hymenoxys Cass. – rubberweed
Hyoseris L.
Hypericophyllum Steetz
Hypochaeris L. – catsear
Hysterionica Willd.
Hystrichophora Mattf.

I

List of genera is from Plants of the World Online  unless otherwise cited.

Ianthopappus Roque & D.J.N.Hind
Ichthyothere Mart.
Idiopappus H.Rob. & Panero
Idiothamnus R.M.King & H.Rob.
Ifloga Cass.
Ignurbia B.Nord.
Iltisia S.F.Blake
Imeria R.M.King & H.Rob.
Indocypraea Orchard
Inezia E.Phillips
Inkaliabum D.G.Gut.
Inula L. – yellowhead
Inulanthera Källersjö
Inulopsis O.Hoffm.
Io B.Nord.
Iodocephalopsis Bunwong & H.Rob.
Iogeton Strother
Ionactis Greene – stiff-leaved asters
Iostephane Benth.
Iotasperma G.L.Nesom
Iphiona Cass.
Iphionopsis Anderb.
Iranecio B.Nord.
Iranoaster Kaz.Osaloo, Farhani & Mozaff.
Ischnea F.Muell.
Ismelia Cass.
Isocarpha Less. – pearlhead
Isocoma Nutt. – goldenbush, jimmyweed
Isoetopsis Turcz.
Isostigma Less.
Iva L. – marshelder, sumpweed
Ixeridium (A.Gray) Tzvelev
Ixeris (Cass.) Cass.
Ixiochlamys F.Muell. & Sond.
Ixiolaena Benth.
Ixodia R.Br.
× Ixyoungia Kitam.

J 

List of genera is from Plants of the World Online  unless otherwise cited.

Jacmaia B.Nord.
Jacobaea Mill.
Jaegeria Kunth
Jalcophila M.O.Dillon & Sagást.
Jaliscoa S.Watson
Jamesianthus S.F.Blake & Sherff
Japonicalia C.Ren & Q.E.Yang
Jaramilloa R.M.King & H.Rob.
Jasonia Cass.
Jaumea Pers.
Jefea Strother
Jeffreya Cabrera
Jeffreycia H.Rob., S.C.Keeley & Skvarla 
Jensia B.G.Baldwin
Jessea H.Rob. & Cuatrec.
Joseanthus H.Rob.
Jungia L.f.
Jurinea Cass.

K

List of genera is from Plants of the World Online  unless otherwise cited.

Karelinia Less.
Karvandarina Rech.f.
Kaschgaria Poljakov
Katinasia Bonif.
Kaunia R.M.King & H.Rob.
Kemulariella Tamamsch.
Keysseria Lauterb.
Khasianthus H.Rob. & Skvarla
Kieslingia Faúndez, Saldivia & A.E.Martic.
Kinghamia C.Jeffrey
Kingianthus H.Rob.
Kippistia F.Muell.
Klasea Cass.
Klaseopsis L.Martins
Kleinia Mill.
Koanophyllon Arruda – thoroughwort
Koehneola Urb.
Koelpinia Pall.
Koyamasia H.Rob.
Krigia Schreb. – dwarf dandelion
Kurziella H.Rob. & Bunwong
Kyhosia B.G.Baldwin
Kyrsteniopsis R.M.King & H.Rob

L

List of genera is from Plants of the World Online  unless otherwise cited.

Lachanodes DC.
Lachnophyllum Bunge
Lachnorhiza A.Rich.
Lachnospermum Willd.
Lactuca L. – lettuce
Laennecia Cass.
Laestadia Kunth ex Less.
Lagascea Cav.
Lagenocypsela Swenson & K.Bremer
Lagenophora Cass. – island-daisy
Laggera Sch.Bip. ex Benth.
Lagophylla Nutt. – hareleaf
Lagoseriopsis Kirp.
Lamprocephalus B.Nord.
Lampropappus (O.Hoffm.) H.Rob.
Lamyropappus Knorring & Tamamsch.
Lamyropsis (Kharadze) Dittrich
Landerolaria G.L.Nesom
Langebergia Anderb.
Lantanopsis C.Wright ex Griseb.
Lapidia Roque & S.C.Ferreira
Lapsana L. – nipplewort
Lapsanastrum Pak & K.Bremer
Lasianthaea DC.
Lasiocephalus Willd. ex D.F.K.Schltdl.
Lasiolaena R.M.King & H.Rob.
Lasiopogon Cass.
Lasiospermum Lag. – cocoonhead
Lasthenia Cass. – goldfield
Launaea Cass. – aulaga
Lawrencella Lindl.
Layia Hook. & Arn. ex DC. – tidytips
Lecocarpus Decne.
Leibnitzia Cass. – sunbonnets
Leiboldia Schltdl.
Leiocarpa Paul G.Wilson
Lemooria P.S.Short
Leonis B.Nord.
Leontodon L. – hawkbit 
Leontopodium R.Br. ex Cass. – edelweiss
× Leontoroides B.Bock
Lepidaploa (Cass.) Cass.
Lepidesmia Klatt
Lepidolopha C.Winkl.
Lepidolopsis Poljakov
Lepidonia S.F.Blake
Lepidophorum Neck. ex DC.
Lepidophyllum Cass.
Lepidospartum A.Gray – broomsage
Lepidostephium Oliv.
Leptinella Cass. – brass buttons, creeping cotula
Leptocarpha DC.
Leptoclinium Gardner ex Benth. & Hook.f.
Leptorhynchos Less. – scaly button
Leptostelma D.Don ex G.Don
Lescaillea Griseb.
Lessingia Cham. – vinegarweed
Lessingianthus H.Rob.
Lettowia H.Rob. & Skvarla
Leucactinia Rydb.
× Leucantanacetum Rauschert
Leucanthemella Tzvelev
Leucanthemopsis (Giroux) Heywood
Leucanthemum Mill. – daisy, oxeye daisy
Leucheria Lag.
Leucoblepharis Arn.
Leucochrysum (DC.) Paul G.Wilson
Leucogenes Beauverd
Leucomeris D.Don
Leucophyta R.Br.
Leucoptera B.Nord
Leucosyris Greene
Leunisia Phil.
Leuzea DC.
Leysera L.
Liabum Adans.
Liatris Gaertn. ex Schreb. – blazing star, gay feather
Libinhania N.Kilian, Galbany, Oberpr. & A.G.Mill.
Lidbeckia P.J.Bergius
Lifago Schweinf. & Muschl.
Ligularia Cass.
Ligulariopsis Y.L.Chen
Lihengia Y.S.Chen & R.Ke 
Limbarda Adans.
Lindheimera A.Gray & Engelm.
Linealia G.L.Nesom
Linochilus Benth.
Linzia Sch.Bip. ex Walp.
Lipoblepharis Orchard
Lipochaeta DC. – nehe
Lipotriche R.Br.
Lipschitzia Zaika, Sukhor. & N.Kilian
Litogyne Harv.
Litothamnus R.M.King & H.Rob.
Llerasia Triana
Logfia Cass. – cottonrose
Lomanthus B.Nord. & Pelser
Lomatozona Baker
Lonas Adans.
Lopholaena DC.
Lophopappus Rusby
Lorandersonia Urbatsch, R.P.Roberts & Neubig
Lordhowea B.Nord.
Lorentzianthus R.M.King & H.Rob.
Lourteigia R.M.King & H.Rob.
Lowryanthus Pruski
Loxothysanus B.L.Rob.
Lucilia Cass.
Luina Benth. – silverback
Lulia Zardini
Lundellianthus H.Rob.
Lundinia B.Nord.
Lycapsus Phil.
Lychnocephalus Mart. ex DC.
Lychnophora Mart.
Lychnophorella Loeuille, Semir & Pirani
Lycoseris Cass.
Lygodesmia D.Don – skeleton weed

M

List of genera is from Plants of the World Online  unless otherwise cited.

Machaeranthera Nees – goldenweed, tansyaster
Macledium Cass.
Macrachaenium Hook.f.
Macropodina R.M.King & H.Rob.
Macvaughiella R.M.King & H.Rob.
Madagaster G.L.Nesom
Madia Molina – tarweed
Mairia Nees
Malacothrix DC. – desert dandelion
Malmeanthus R.M.King & H.Rob.
Malperia S.Watson
Mantisalca Cass.
Manyonia H.Rob.
Marasmodes DC.
Marshallia Schreb. – Barbara's buttons
Marshalljohnstonia Henrickson
Marticorenia Crisci
Maschalostachys Loeuille & Roque
Matricaria L. – mayweed
Mattfeldanthus H.Rob. & R.M.King
Mattfeldia Urb.
Mauranthemum Vogt & Oberpr.
Mecomischus Coss. ex Benth. & Hook.f.
Medranoa Urbatsch & R.P.Roberts
Melampodium L. – blackfoot
Melanodendron DC.
Melanoseris Decne.
Melanthera Rohr – squarestem
Merrittia Merr.
Mesanthophora H.Rob.
Mesogramma DC.
Metalasia R.Br.
Mexerion G.L.Nesom
Mexianthus B.L.Rob.
Micractis DC.
Microcephala Pobed.
Microglossa DC.
Microgyne Cass.
Microliabum Cabrera
Micropsis DC.
Micropus L. – cottonseed
Microseris D.Don – silverpuffs, yam daisy
Microspermum Lag.
Mikania Willd. – hempvine
Mikaniopsis Milne-Redh.
Milleria Houst. ex L.
Millotia Cass.
Minasia H.Rob.
Minuria DC.
Miricacalia Kitam.
Misbrookea V.A.Funk
Mixtecalia Redonda-Mart., García-Mend. & D.Sandoval
Mniodes (A.Gray) Benth.
Monactinocephalus Klatt
Monactis Kunth
Monarrhenus Cass.
Monogereion G.M.Barroso & R.M.King
Monolopia DC.
Monoptilon Torr. & A.Gray – desertstar
Monosis DC.
Montanoa Cerv.
Monticalia C.Jeffrey
Moonia Arn.
Moquinia DC.
Moquiniastrum (Cabrera) G.Sancho
Morithamnus R.M.King, H.Rob. & G.M.Barroso
Moscharia Ruiz & Pav.
Msuata O.Hoffm.
Mtonia Beentje
Muellerolaria G.L.Nesom
Munnozia Ruiz & Pav.
Munzothamnus P.H.Raven
Muschleria S.Moore
Muscosomorphe J.C.Manning
Mutisia L.f.
Myanmaria H.Rob.
Myopordon Boiss.
Myriactis Less.
Myriocephalus Benth.
Myripnois Bunge
Myrovernix Koek.
Myxopappus Källersjö

N

List of genera is from Plants of the World Online  unless otherwise cited.

Nabalus Cass.
Nahuatlea V.A.Funk
Namibithamnus H.Rob., Skvarla & V.A.Funk
Nananthea DC.
Nannoglottis Maxim.
Nardophyllum Hook. & Arn.
Narvalina Cass.
Nassauvia Comm. ex Juss.
Neblinaea Maguire & Wurdack
Neja D.Don
Nelsonianthus H.Rob. & Brettell
Nemosenecio (Kitam.) B.Nord.
Neobrachyactis Brouillet
Neocabreria R.M.King & H.Rob.
Neocuatrecasia R.M.King & H.Rob.
Neojeffreya Cabrera
Neolaria G.L.Nesom
Neomirandea R.M.King & H.Rob.
Neopallasia Poljakov
Neotysonia Dalla Torre & Harms
Nesampelos B.Nord.
Nesomia B.L.Turner
Nestlera Spreng.
Nestotus R.P.Roberts, Urbatsch & Neubig
Neurolaena R.Br.
Neurolakis Mattf.
Nicolasia S.Moore
Nicolletia A.Gray – hole-in-the-sand
Nidorella Cass.
Nipponanthemum (Kitam.) Kitam.
Nivellea B.H.Wilcox, K.Bremer & Humphries
Nolletia Cass.
Nordenstamia Lundin
Nothobaccharis R.M.King & H.Rob.
Nothoschkuhria B.G.Baldwin
Nothovernonia H.Rob. & V.A.Funk
Noticastrum DC.
Notisia P.S.Short
Notobasis (Cass.) Cass. – Syrian thistle
Notopappus Klingenb.
Notoseris C.Shih
Nouelia Franch.
Novaguinea D.J.N.Hind
Novenia S.E.Freire

O

List of genera is from Plants of the World Online  unless otherwise cited.

Oblivia Strother
Ochrocephala Dittrich
Oclemena Greene 
Odixia Orchard
Odontocline B.Nord.
Oedera L.
Okia H.Rob. & Skvarla
Oldenburgia Less.
Oldfeltia B.Nord. & Lundin
Olearia Moench
Olgaea Iljin
Oligactis Cass.
Oliganthes Cass.
Oligocarpus Less.
Oligochaeta K.Koch
Oligothrix DC.
Omalotheca Cass. – arctic cudweed
Omphalopappus O.Hoffm.
Oncosiphon Källersjö
Ondetia Benth.
Onopordum L. – cotton thistle
Onoseris Willd.
Oocephala (S.B.Jones) H.Rob.
Oonopsis (Nutt.) Greene – false goldenweed
Oparanthus Sherff
Ophryosporus Meyen
Opisthopappus C.Shih
Orbivestus H.Rob.
Oreochrysum Rydb.
Oreoseris DC.
Oreostemma Greene 
Oresbia Cron & B.Nord.
Oriastrum Poepp.
Oritrophium (Kunth) Cuatrec.
Orochaenactis Coville
Orthopappus Gleason
Ortizacalia Pruski
Osbertia Greene
Osmadenia Nutt.
Osmiopsis R.M.King & H.Rob.
Osmitopsis Cass.
Osteospermum L.
Oteiza La Llave
Othonna L.
Otoglyphis Pomel
Otopappus Benth.
Otospermum Willk.
Oxycarpha S.F.Blake
Oxylaena Benth. ex Anderb.
Oxylobus (Moc. ex DC.) A.Gray
Oxypappus Benth.
Oxyphyllum Phil.
Oyedaea DC.
Ozothamnus R.Br.

P

List of genera is from Plants of the World Online  unless otherwise cited.

Pachylaena D.Don ex Hook. & Arn.
Pachystegia Cheeseman
Pacifigeron G.L.Nesom
Packera A.Love & D.Love
Pacourina Aubl.
Paenula Orchard
Palafoxia Lag. – palafox
Pallenis (Cass.) Cass.
Panaetia Cass.
Paneroa E.E.Schill.
Panphalea Lag.
Pappobolus S.F.Blake
Pappochroma Raf.
Papuacalia Veldkamp
Paquirea Panero & S.E.Freire
Paracalia Cuatrec.
Parafaujasia C.Jeffrey
Paragynoxys (Cuatrec.) Cuatrec.
Paralychnophora MacLeish
Paranephelius Poepp.
Parantennaria Beauverd
Parapiqueria R.M.King & H.Rob.
Parapolydora H.Rob.
Paraprenanthes C.C.Chang ex C.Shih
Parasenecio W.W.Sm. & Small – Indian plantain
Parastrephia Nutt.
Parthenice A.Gray
Parthenium L. – feverfew, guayule
Pasaccardoa Kuntze
Pascalia Ortega 
Paurolepis S.Moore
Pechuel-loeschea O.Hoffm.
Pectis L. – cinchweed, fetid marigold
Pegolettia Cass.
Pelucha S.Watson
Pembertonia P.S.Short
Pentacalia Cass.
Pentachaeta Nutt. – pygmy daisy
Pentalepis F.Muell.
Pentanema Cass.
Pentatrichia Klatt
Pentzia Thunb.
Perdicium L.
Perezia Lag.
Pericallis D.Don – includes florist's cineraria
Pericome A.Gray
Peripleura (N.T.Burb.) G.L.Nesom
Perityle Benth. – rock daisy
Perralderia Coss.
Pertya Sch.Bip.
Perymeniopsis H.Rob.
Perymenium Schrad.
Petalacte D.Don
Petasites Mill. – butterbur
Peteravenia R.M.King & H.Rob.
Petradoria Greene – rock goldenrod
Petrobium R.Br.
Peucephyllum A.Gray
Phacellothrix F.Muell.
Phaenocoma D.Don
Phagnalon Cass.
Phalacrachena Iljin
Phalacraea DC.
Phalacrocarpum Willk.
Phalacroseris A.Gray – mock dandelion
Phaneroglossa B.Nord.
Phania DC.
Phaseolaster G.L.Nesom
Philactis Schrad.
Philoglossa DC.
Phitosia Kamari & Greuter
Phoebanthus S.F.Blake – false sunflower
Phyllocephalum Blume
Phymaspermum Less.
Picnomon Adans.
Picradeniopsis Rydb. – bahia 
Picris L. – oxtongue
Picrosia D.Don
Pilbara Lander
Pilosella Hill
Pinaropappus Less. – rock lettuce
Pinillosia Ossa
Piora J.Kost.
Pippenalia McVaugh
Piptocarpha R.Br. – ash daisy
Piptocoma Less. – velvetshrub
Piptolepis Sch.Bip.
Piqueria Cav.
Piqueriella R.M.King & H.Rob.
Pithocarpa Lindl.
Pittocaulon H.Rob. & Brettell
Pityopsis Nutt. – silkgrass
Pladaroxylon (Endl.) Hook.f.
Plagiobasis Schrenk
Plagiocheilus Arn. ex DC.
Plagiolophus Greenm.
Plagius L'Her. ex DC.
Planaltoa Taub.
Planea P.O.Karis
Plateilema Cockerell
Platycarpha Less.
Platycarphella V.A.Funk & H.Rob.
Platypodanthera R.M.King & H.Rob.
Platyschkuhria Rydb. – basin daisy
Plazia Ruiz & Pav.
Plecostachys Hilliard & B.L.Burtt
Plectocephalus D.Don
Pleiacanthus (Nutt.) Rydb.
Pleiotaxis Steetz
Pleocarphus D.Don
Pleurocarpaea Benth.
Pleurocoronis R.M.King & H.Rob.
Pleurophyllum Hook.f.
Pluchea Cass. – camphorweed, fleabane
Podachaenium Benth. ex Oerst.
Podanthus Lag.
Podocoma Cass.
Podolepis Labill.
Podotheca Cass.
Poecilolepis Grau
Pogonolepis Steetz
Pojarkovia Askerova
Poljakanthema Kamelin
Poljakovia Grubov & Filatova
Polyachyrus Lag.
Polyanthina R.M.King & H.Rob.
Polyarrhena Cass.
Polycalymma F.Muell. & Sond.
Polymnia Kalm
Porophyllum Guett. – poreleaf
Porphyrostemma Benth. ex Oliv.
Praxeliopsis G.M.Barroso
Praxelis Cass.
Prenanthes L. – rattlesnakeroot
Prestelia Sch.Bip. ex Benth. & Hook.f.
Printzia Cass.
Prolobus R.M.King & H.Rob.
Prolongoa Boiss.
Proteopsis Mart. & Zucc. ex Sch.Bip.
Proustia Lag.
Psacaliopsis H.Rob. & Brettell
Psacalium Cass. – Indianbush
Psathyrotes A.Gray – turtleback, brittlestem
Psathyrotopsis Rydb.
Psednotrichia Hiern
Psephellus Cass.
Pseudelephantopus Rohr – dog's-tongue 
Pseudobaccharis Cabrera
Pseudobahia Rydb. – sunburst
Pseudoblepharispermum J.-P.Lebrun & Stork
Pseudobrickellia R.M.King & H.Rob.
Pseudoclappia Rydb. – false clapdaisy
Pseudoconyza Cuatrec.
Pseudoglossanthis Poljakov
Pseudognaphalium Kirp. – cudweed
Pseudogynoxys (Greenm.) Cabrera
Pseudohandelia Tzvelev
Pseudonoseris H.Rob. & Brettell
Pseudopegolettia H.Rob., Skvarla & V.A.Funk
Pseudopiptocarpha H.Rob.
Pseudopodospermum (Lipsch. & Krasch.) Kuth.
Pseudostifftia H.Rob.
Psiadia Jacq.
Psilactis A.Gray – tansyaster
Psilocarphus Nutt. – woollyheads
Psilostrophe DC. – paperflower
Psychrogeton Boiss.
Pterachaenia (Benth. & Hook.f.) Lipsch.
Pterocaulon Elliott – blackroot
Pterochaeta Steetz
Pteronia L.
Pterothrix DC.
Pterygopappus Hook.f.
Ptilostemon Cass.
Pulicaria Gaertn. – false fleabane
Pulicarioidea Bunwong, Chantar. & S.C.Keeley
Pycnosorus Benth.
Pyrrhopappus DC. – desert chicory
Pyrrocoma Hook. – goldenweed
Pytinicarpa G.L.Nesom

Q 

List of genera is from Plants of the World Online  unless otherwise cited.

Quadribractea Orchard
Quasiantennaria R.J.Bayer & M.O.Dillon
Quechualia H.Rob.
Quelchia N.E.Br.
Quinetia Cass.
Quinqueremulus Paul G.Wilson

R

List of genera is from Plants of the World Online  unless otherwise cited.

Rachelia J.M.Ward & Breitw.
Radlkoferotoma Kuntze
Rafinesquia Nutt. – California chicory
Raillardella (A.Gray) Benth. & Hook.f. – silvermat (?)
Rainiera Greene
Ramaliella Zaika, Sukhor. & N.Kilian
Raoulia Hook.f. – vegetable sheep
Raouliopsis S.F.Blake
Rastrophyllum Wild & G.V.Pope
Ratibida Raf. – prairie coneflower
Raulinoreitzia R.M.King & H.Rob.
Rayjacksonia R.L.Hartm. & M.A.Lane – tansyaster (?)
Reichardia Roth – brighteyes
Remya Hillebr. ex Benth. & Hook.f.
Rensonia S.F.Blake
Rhagadiolus Juss.
Rhamphogyne S.Moore
Rhanteriopsis Rauschert
Rhanterium Desf.
Rhaponticoides Vaill.
Rhetinocarpha Paul G.Wilson & M.A.Wilson
Rhetinolepis Coss.
Rhodanthe Lindl. – sunray
Rhodanthemum B.H.Wilcox, K.Bremer & Humphries
Rhynchopsidium DC.
Richterago Kuntze
Richteria Kar. & Kir.
Riencourtia Cass.
Rigiopappus A. Gray
Robinsonecio T.M.Barkley & Janovec
Robinsonia DC.
Rochonia DC.
Roebuckiella P.S.Short
Rojasianthe Standl. & Steyerm.
Rolandra Rottb. – yerba de plata
Roldana La Llave – groundsel
Roodebergia B.Nord.
Rothmaleria Font Quer
Rudbeckia L. – coneflower
Rugelia Shuttlew. ex Chapm. – Rugel's Indian plantain
Rumfordia DC.
Russowia C.Winkl.
Rutidosis DC.

S

List of genera is from Plants of the World Online  unless otherwise cited.

Sabazia Cass.
Sachsia Griseb.
Salcedoa Jiménez Rodr. & Katinas
Salmea DC. – bejuco de miel
Sampera V.A.Funk & H.Rob.
Sanrobertia G.L.Nesom
Santolina L. – lavender cotton
Santosia R.M.King & H.Rob.
Sanvitalia Lam. – creeping zinnia
Sarcanthemum Cass.
Sartwellia A.Gray – glowwort
Saussurea DC. – saw-wort
Scabrethia W.A.Weber
Scalesia Arn.
Scapisenecio Schmidt-Leb.
Scherya R.M.King & H.Rob.
Schischkinia Iljin
Schistocarpha Less.
Schistostephium Less.
Schizogyne Cass.
Schizoptera Turcz.
Schizotrichia Benth.
Schkuhria Roth – false threadleaf
Schlagintweitia Griseb.
Schlechtendalia Less.
Schoenia Steetz
Sciadocephala Mattf.
Sclerocarpus Jacq. – bonebract
Sclerolepis Cass. – bogbutton
Sclerorhachis (Rech.f.) Rech.f.
Scolymus Tourn. ex L. – golden thistle
Scorzonera L. – salsify
Scorzoneroides Moench
Scrobicaria Cass.
Selloa Kunth
Semiria D.J.N.Hind
Senecio L. – groundsel, ragwort
Sericocarpus Nees – whitetop aster
Seriphium L.
Serratula L. – plumeless saw-wort
Shafera Greenm.
Shangwua Yu J.Wang, Raab-Straube, Susanna & J.Quan Liu
Sheareria S.Moore
Shinnersia R.M.King & H.Rob.
Shinnersoseris Tomb – beaked skeletonweed
Siapaea Pruski
Sidneya E.E.Schill. & Panero
Siebera J.Gay
Siemssenia Steetz
Sigesbeckia L. – St. Paul's wort
Siloxerus Labill.
Silphium L. – rosinweed
Silybum Adans. – milk thistle
Simsia Pers. – bush sunflower
Sinacalia H.Rob. & Brettell
Sinclairia Hook. & Arn.
Sinosenecio B.Nord.
Sinoseris N.Kilian, Ze H.Wang & H.Peng
Smallanthus Mack.
Soaresia Sch.Bip.
Solanecio (Sch.Bip.) Walp.
Solenogyne Cass.
Solidago L. – goldenrod
Soliva Ruiz & Pav. – burrweed
Sommerfeltia Less.
Sonchella Sennikov
Sonchus L. – sow thistle, sowthistle
Sondottia P.S.Short
Soroseris Stebbins
Spaniopappus B.L.Rob.
Sphaeranthus L.
Sphaereupatorium Kuntze
Sphaeromorphaea DC.
Sphagneticola O.Hoffm. – creeping-oxeye
Spilanthes Jacq. – toothache flower
Spinoliva G.Sancho, Luebert & Katinas
Spiracantha Kunth – dogwoodleaf
Spiroseris Rech.f.
Spongotrichum (DC.) Nees ex Spach
Squamopappus R.K.Jansen, N.A.Harriman & Urbatsch
Stachycephalum Sch.Bip. ex Benth.
Staehelina L.
Standleyanthus R.M.King & H.Rob.
Staurochlamys Baker
Steiractinia S.F.Blake
Steirodiscus Less.
Stenachaenium Benth.
Stenocarpha S.F.Blake
Stenocephalum Sch.Bip.
Stenocline DC.
Stenopadus S.F.Blake
Stenops B.Nord.
Stenotus Nutt. – mock goldenweed
Stephanbeckia H.Rob. & V.A.Funk
Stephanodoria Greene
Stephanomeria Nutt. – wire lettuce
Stevia Cav. – candyleaf
Steviopsis R.M.King & H.Rob.
Steyermarkina R.M.King & H.Rob.
Stifftia J.C.Mikan
Stilpnogyne DC.
Stilpnolepis Krasch.
Stilpnopappus Mart. ex DC.
Stizolophus Cass.
Stoebe L.
Stokesia L'Hér.
Stomatanthes R.M.King & H.Rob.
Stomatochaeta (S.F.Blake) Maguire & Wurdack
Stramentopappus H.Rob. & V.A.Funk
Streptoglossa Steetz ex F.Muell.
Strobocalyx (Blume ex DC.) Spach
Strotheria B.L.Turner
Struchium P.Browne
Stuartina Sond.
Stylocline Nutt. – neststraw, woolly fishhooks
Stylotrichium Mattf.
Symphyllocarpus Maxim.
Symphyopappus Turcz.
Symphyotrichum Nees
Syncalathium Lipsch.
Syncarpha DC.
Syncephalum DC.
Syncretocarpus S.F.Blake
Synedrella Gaertn.
Synedrellopsis Hieron. & Kuntze
Syneilesis Maxim.
Synotis (C.B.Clarke) C.Jeffrey & Y.L.Chen
Syntrichopappus A.Gray – Fremont's gold
Synurus Iljin
Syreitschikovia Pavlov

T

List of genera is from Plants of the World Online  unless otherwise cited.

Tagetes L. – marigold
Taimingasa (Kitam.) C.Ren & Q.E.Yang
Takhtajaniantha Nazarova
Talamancalia H.Rob. & Cuatrec.
Talamancaster Pruski
Tamananthus V.M.Badillo
Tamaulipa R.M.King & H.Rob. – boneset
Tanacetopsis (Tzvelev) Kovalevsk.
Tanacetum L. – tansy, feverfew
Taplinia Lander
Taraxacum F.H.Wigg. – dandelion
Tarchonanthus L.
Tarlmounia H.Rob., S.C.Keeley, Skvarla & R.Chan
Tehuana Panero & Villaseñor
Teixeiranthus R.M.King & H.Rob.
Telanthophora H.Rob. & Brettell
Telekia Baumg.
Telmatophila Mart. ex Baker
Tenrhynea Hilliard & B.L.Burtt
Tephroseris (Rchb.) Rchb. – fleawort
Tessaria Ruiz & Pav.
Tetrachyron Schltdl.
Tetradymia DC. – horsebrush
Tetragonotheca L. – nerveray
Tetramolopium Nees
Tetraneuris Greene – four-nerve daisy
Tetranthus Sw.
Tetraperone Urb.
Thaminophyllum Harv.
Thelesperma Less. – greenthread
Thespidium F.Muell. ex Benth.
Thespis DC.
Thevenotia DC.
Thiseltonia Hemsl.
Thurovia Rose
Thymophylla Lag. – pricklyleaf
Thymopsis Benth.
Tietkensia P.S.Short
Tilesia G.Mey.
Tithonia Desf. ex Juss.
Toiyabea R.P.Roberts, Urbatsch & Neubig
Tolpis Adans. – umbrella milkwort
Tomentaurum G.L.Nesom
Tonestus A.Nelson – serpentweed
Tourneuxia Coss.
Townsendia Hook. – Townsend daisy
Tracyina S.F.Blake – Indian headdress
Tragopogon L. – goat's beard, salsify
Traversia Hook.f.
Trepadonia H.Rob.
Trichanthemis Regel & Schmalh.
Trichanthodium Sond. & F.Muell.
Trichocline Cass.
Trichocoronis A.Gray – bugheal
Trichocoryne S.F.Blake
Trichogonia (DC.) Gardner
Trichogoniopsis R.M.King & H.Rob.
Tricholepis DC.
Trichoptilium A.Gray
Trichospira Kunth
Tridactylina Sch.Bip.
Tridax L.
Trigonopterum Steetz
Trigonospermum Less.
Trioncinia (F.Muell.) Veldkamp
× Tripleurocota Starm.
Tripleurospermum Sch.Bip. – mayweed
× Tripleurothemis Stace
Triplocephalum O.Hoffm.
Tripolium Nees – sea aster (?)
Triptilion Ruiz & Pav.
Triptilodiscus Turcz.
Trixis Sw.
Troglophyton Hilliard & B.L.Burtt
Tuberculocarpus Pruski
Tuberostylis Steetz
Tugarinovia Iljin
Turanecio Hamzaoğlu
Turczaninovia DC.
Tussilago L. – coltsfoot
Tuxtla Villaseñor & Strother
Tyleropappus Greenm.
Tyrimnus (Cass.) Bosc
Tzvelevopyrethrum Kamelin

U 

List of genera is from Plants of the World Online  unless otherwise cited.

Ugamia Pavlov
Uleophytum Hieron.
Uniyala H.Rob. & Skvarla
Unxia Kunth
Urbinella Greenm.
Urmenetea Phil.
Urolepis (DC.) R.M.King & H.Rob.
Urospermum Scop.
Urostemon B.Nord.
Ursinia Gaertn.

V 

List of genera is from Plants of the World Online  unless otherwise cited.

Varilla A.Gray
Vellereophyton Hilliard & B.L.Burtt
Venegasia DC.
Verbesina L. – crownbeard
Vernonanthura H.Rob.
Vernonella Sond.
Vernonia Schreb. – ironweed
Vernoniastrum H.Rob.
Vernoniopsis Dusén
Vicinia G.L.Nesom
Vickia Roque & G.Sancho
Vickifunkia C.Ren, L.Wang, I.D.Illar. & Q.E.Yang
Vicoa Cass.
Vieraea Sch.Bip.
Vigethia W.A.Weber
Viguiera Kunth – goldeneye
Villanova Lag.
Villasenoria B.L.Clark
Vinicia Dematt.
Vittadinia A.Rich.
Vittetia R.M.King & H.Rob.
Volutaria Cass.

W

List of genera is from Plants of the World Online  unless otherwise cited.

Waitzia J.C.Wendl.
Walshia Jeanes
Walsholaria G.L.Nesom
Wamalchitamia Strother
Warionia Benth. & Coss.
Wedelia Jacq. – creepingoxeye
Welwitschiella O.Hoffm.
Werneria Kunth
Westoniella Cuatrec.
Wilkesia A.Gray – iliau
Willemetia Neck.
Wollastonia DC. ex Decne.
Wollemiaster G.L.Nesom
Wunderlichia Riedel ex Benth. & Hook.f.
Wyethia Nutt. – mule-ears

X

List of genera is from Plants of the World Online  unless otherwise cited. Common names are cited individually.

Xanthisma DC. – sleepy-daisy
Xanthium L. – cocklebur
Xanthocephalum Willd.
Xanthopappus C.Winkl.
Xeranthemum L.
Xerochrysum Tzvelev
Xiphochaeta Poepp.
Xylanthemum Tzvelev
Xylorhiza Nutt. – woody-asters

Y

List of genera is from Plants of the World Online  unless otherwise cited. Common names are cited individually.

Yariguianthus S.Diáz & Rodr.-Cabeza
Yermo Dorn – desert yellowhead
Youngia Cass.
Yunquea Skottsb.

Z

List of genera is from Plants of the World Online  unless otherwise cited.

Zaluzania Pers.
Zandera D.L.Schulz
Zemisia B.Nord.
Zexmenia La Llave
Zinnia L.
Zoegea L.
Zyrphelis Cass.
Zyzyura H.Rob. & Pruski
Zyzyxia Strother

References

Citations

Sources

External links
 USDA Plants Database
 ITIS 35420 2002-09-10
 For full list, see
Kew
SysTax

 
Asteraceae